is located in Bunkyo, Tokyo, Japan. Its collection includes fine Japanese art objects.

The museum was opened in April 2000, in order to commemorate the 90th anniversary of the founding of Japan's largest  publishing company, Kodansha Publishing Company. It was the residence of the former Kodansha president Sawako Noma, the grand daughter of its founder, Seiji Noma. One of the museum's exhibits is the Noma Japanese Art Collection, art objects collected by Seiji Noma in the early part of the 20th century. Featured artists include Kawai Gyokudō, Uemura Shōen, Kiyokata Kaburagi, and more.  The Noma collection includes works by Yokoyama Taikan and other modern Japanese and Western artists, sculpture and ceramics. There are also 6,000 shikishi (decorated Japanese paper or silk used originally for artistic prose, etc) received directly from the artists. The collection reflects an overview of the trends in the history of modern Japanese art. The Museum also displays the Publication Culture Collection, which presents valuable cultural treasures that have been collected from the Meiji Era to the Heisei Era.

External links 
 Museum's Homepage (English, Japanese)
 Bunkyo City Information

Buildings and structures in Bunkyō
Art museums and galleries in Tokyo
Art museums established in 2000
2000 establishments in Japan